Miani Hor is a swampy lagoon southwest of Uthal, lying on the coast of Lasbela District of Balochistan, Pakistan. Covering an area of 7,471 hectares, it was designated a Ramsar site in May 2001.

Location
The site is located just southwest of Uthal, the district headquarter, and 95 kilometres from Karachi, near Sonmiani Bay.

Site description
The lagoon is 60 km long and 4 to 5 km wide. It mouth is 4 km wide. Two seasonal rivers, Porali and Windor enter into this bay.

Flora and fauna
It is the only place in Pakistan where three species of mangroves, Avicennia marina, Rhizophora mucronata, and Ceriops tagal occur naturally.

Threats
It faces two threats, namely domestic waste disposal and accumulated solid waste debris.

References

Lasbela District
Lagoons of Pakistan
Ramsar sites in Pakistan
Landforms of Balochistan (Pakistan)